Chrysopsyche lamani is a moth of the family Lasiocampidae first described by Per Olof Christopher Aurivillius in 1906. It is found in the Democratic Republic of the Congo.

References
Aurivillius, C. 1906. Verzeichnis von Lepidopteren, gesammelt beu Mukimbungu am unteren Kongo von Herrn E. Laman. Zweite und dritte Sendung. Arkiv för Zoologi 3(1):1–16, pl. 1.

External links
Swedish Museum of Natural History: Images of the type

Moths described in 1906
Lasiocampinae
Endemic fauna of the Democratic Republic of the Congo